Massa Martana (near the well attested ancient site of the Vicus Martis Tudertium on the Via Flaminia) is an ancient Italian town and comune in the Monti Martani mountain range in the province of Perugia (Umbria). It is 10 km N of Acquasparta, 18 km N of San Gemini and 32 km N of Narni; 14 km S of Bastardo and 27 km S of Bevagna. As of the 2003 census, the town had 3558 inhabitants.

It is one of the classic walled towns of central Italy, and in its main gate can be seen several ancient inscriptions, including a Roman one of some interest. The modern town has spread northwards along the road.

Territory
The territory of the commune includes three well-preserved Romanesque churches, each built in part of Roman stone in the abbeys of S. Fidenzio, of Santa Maria in Pantano and of San Faustino. The medieval abbey church of Santa Maria in Viepri was erected in the 12th century. The modern shrine at Colvalenza (6 km southwest) now draws pilgrims.

Other churches include:
Santa Maria della Concezione
Sant'Ippolito
San Giovanni Battista
Santuario della Madonna di Castelvecchio
San Pietro in Monte
Sant'Arnaldo
San Sebastiano
San Felice
Santa Maria della Pace
San Valentino
Sant'Ilario
Chiesa dell'Ascensione
Sant'Antonino de Castro
Santa Illuminata
San Pietro sopra le acque
Sant'Antonio del Busseto
Santa Maria delle Grazie
San Giovanni
Santa Degna
San Sebastiano
San Bernardino

Earthquake of 1997
The buildings of the walled town suffered major damage in an earthquake on May 12, 1997, a precursor of the 1997 earthquake which damaged much of Umbria, including the Basilica and city of Assisi. The Commune celebrated the completion of restoration works and the reopening of the old town in August 2006, ten years after the  earthquake.

Culture
Massa Martana town has an annual ice-cream festival ("sagra del gelato") in early August each year. Similar food festivals are celebrated in summer months in a number of surrounding villages and hamlets within the commune, including Colpetrazzo and Villa San Faustino. During the Christmas period in  Massa Martana is held a popular Christmas Exhibition, named "Presepi d'Italia" with Traditional Christmas Cribs and Art works: all dedicated to the Holy Nativity. The artworks are coming from all the Italian regions and are characterised by their local tradition and different culture.

References

External links
Official site
Thayer's Gazetteer of Umbria

(The text of this article is partly based on the article in Bill Thayer's Gazetteer of Italy, by permission.)

Cities and towns in Umbria
Roman sites of Umbria